Roberto Colombo may refer to:

 Roberto Colombo (footballer) (born 1975), Italian football player
 Roberto Colombo (motorcyclist) (1927–1957), Italian former Grand Prix motorcycle racer
 Roberto Colombo (politician), Italian politician
 Roberto Colombo (music producer), Italian music producer